Herbert Eric Huppert  (born 26 November 1943) is an Australian-born geophysicist living in Britain.  He has been Professor of Theoretical Geophysics and Foundation Director, Institute of Theoretical Geophysics, at the University of Cambridge, since 1989 and Fellow of King's College, Cambridge, since 1970.

Education and early life
Huppert was born in Sydney and he received his early education at Sydney Boys High School (1956–59). He graduated in applied mathematics from Sydney University with first class Honours, a University medal and the Barker Travelling Fellowship in 1964. He then completed a PhD supervised by John W. Miles at the University of California, San Diego, and came as an ICI Post-doctoral Fellow to DAMTP in Cambridge in 1968.

Career and research
He has published using fluid-mechanical principles in applications to the Earth sciences: in meteorology, oceanography and geology. He was a member of the Editorial Board of the Journal of Fluid Mechanics (1970–1992), the Philosophical Transactions of the Royal Society (series A) (1994–99), The Proceedings of the Royal Society (series A) (2015-2020) and Geomechanics and Geophysics for Geo-energy and Georesources (2014 — ) and has been on the Council of the Royal Society (2001–03). He was Chairman of a Royal Society Working Group on bioterrorism, which produced a Report entitled 'Making the UK Safer', on 21 April 2004. He was also chair of the European Academies Science Advisory Committee (EASAC) Working Group which produced a report of the European Parliament and President on carbon capture and storage. He was awarded the 2011 Bakerian lecture for his research into geological fluid dynamics. Since 1990 he has held a part-time Professorship at the University of New South Wales in Sydney, Australia.

Awards and honours
Huppert was elected a Fellow of the Royal Society (FRS) in 1987. In 2005 he was the only non-American recipient of a prize from the United States National Academy of Sciences, being awarded the Arthur L. Day Prize and Lectureship for contributions to the Earth sciences. He has been elected a Fellow of the American Geophysical Union, the American Physical Society and the Academia Europaea.. In 2020 he was awarded a Royal Medal and named Scientist of the Year in Earth Science.

Personal life
In 1966, Huppert married Felicia (née Ferster); she is an Emerita Professor of Psychology and a past fellow of Darwin College, Cambridge. They divorced in 2016. His sons, Julian and Rowan, studied at the University of Cambridge. Julian Huppert was the Liberal Democrat Member of Parliament for Cambridge from 2010 to 2015 and is now the Foundation Director of the Intellectual Forum of Jesus College, Cambridge.

References

Bibliography
 Debrett's People of Today
 Jewish Year Book, 2005
'Making the UK safer' report on bioterrorism
'Lecture July 2011 – Carbon storage: caught between a rock and climate change, Professor Herbert Huppert FRS

External links
 Interviewed by Alan Macfarlane 25 May 2009 (video)

1943 births
Fellows of the Royal Society
British Jews
Australian emigrants to England
Australian Jews
Living people
Fellows of King's College, Cambridge
British geophysicists
Cambridge mathematicians
Fellows of the American Geophysical Union
Fellows of the American Physical Society
Scientists from Sydney
People educated at Sydney Boys High School
University of Sydney alumni
University of California, San Diego alumni
Fluid dynamicists